The ISAA Player of the Year was an annual U.S. college soccer award presented by the Intercollegiate Soccer Association of America (ISAA) between 1984 and 1995.  In 1984, the ISAA began recognizing outstanding men's NCAA soccer players with an annual Player of the Year award.  In 1985 the ISAA expanded its recognition program to include women's collegiate players.  The ISAA continued to award this honor through the 1995 season, the last year that any player was named.  The NCAA recognizes these players in its record books.

Men's Player of the Year
 1995 — Matt McKeon, St. Louis
 1994 — Brian Maisonneuve, Indiana
 1993 — Brian McBride, St. Louis
 1992 — Robert Ukrop, Davidson
 1991 — Henry Gutierrez, NC State
 1990 — Billy Thompson, UCLA
 1989 — Robert Paterson, Evansville
 1988 — Dan Donigan, Connecticut
 1987 — Bruce Murray, Clemson
 1986 — John Kerr, Duke
 1985 — Michael Brady, American
 1984 — Amr Aly, Columbia

Women's Player of the Year
 1995 — Natalie Neaton, William & Mary
 1994 — Tisha Venturini, North Carolina
 1993 — Mia Hamm, North Carolina
 1992 — Mia Hamm, North Carolina
 1991 — Kristine Lilly, North Carolina
 1990 — Brandi Chastain, Santa Clara
 1989 — Shannon Higgins, North Carolina
 1988 — Michelle Akers, UCF
 1987 — Megan McCarthy, William & Mary
 1986 — April Heinrichs, North Carolina
 1985 — Pam Baughman, George Mason

See also

 List of sports awards honoring women
 Hermann Trophy
 Soccer America Player of the Year Award

External links
2006 NCAA Record Book - see p. 90

Awards disestablished in 1995
College soccer trophies and awards in the United States
Awards established in 1984
Association football trophies and awards
Women's association football trophies and awards